Spring Garden Lane is a street in Wan Chai, Hong Kong, connecting Queen's Road East to its south, and Johnston Road to the north. It was one of the first focal areas developed by the British in Hong Kong during the 1840s.

History
During the early development of Wan Chai, one of the focal area of development was Spring Gardens. The name was used by the British during the early Colonial Hong Kong era in the 1840s. The word "spring" in "Spring Gardens" was supposed to be referring to a water spring. However, when the name "Spring Garden Lane" was translated into Chinese, the resulting name became "", with the character "" meaning spring season. The water spring mentioned possibly refers to the mountain creek beside Hopewell Centre in Queen's Road East.

In the early 1900s, Spring Garden Lane and Sam Pan Street became a red-light district with western and eastern prostitutes. To attract attention, brothels were displaying large street number plates, and the area became known as "Big Number Brothels".

During the founding of the People's Republic of China around 1948 to 1949, many of the Communist party guerrilla forces found their way to Hong Kong after World War II. One of them was the East River Guerrilla Force, which formed a pro-Communist underground group called the Hailiushe. They were headquartered in the rooftop of a multi-story house on Spring Garden Lane. The area and group was raided by the Hong Kong police, while it was an operating network cell. 

Around Spring Garden Lane are Lee Tung Street, Swatow Street and Amoy Street where warehouses abounded, storing cargoes to be shipped to Chinese coastline cities.

Intersections

See also
 Queen's Road East, for a list of lanes connecting Johnston Road and Queen's Road East

References

External links

 Picture of "Big Number Houses" on gwulo.com

Wan Chai
Roads on Hong Kong Island